John Test (1781 – October 9, 1849) was a U.S. Representative from Indiana.

John Test was born and raised near Salem, New Jersey. He moved to Fayette County, Pennsylvania, and operated Fayette Chance Furnace for several years.
He moved to Cincinnati, and then to Brookville, Indiana, and operated a grist mill.
He studied law.
He was admitted to the bar and began practice in Brookville, Indiana.
He held several local offices.
He served as judge of the third district circuit 1816–1819.

Test was elected as a Jackson Republican to the Eighteenth Congress and reelected as an Adams candidate to the Nineteenth Congress (March 4, 1823 – March 3, 1827).
He was an unsuccessful candidate for reelection in 1826 to the Twentieth Congress.

Test was elected as an Anti-Jacksonian to the Twenty-first Congress (March 4, 1829 – March 3, 1831).
Presiding judge of the Indiana circuit court.
He moved to Mobile, Alabama, and resumed the practice of law.
He died near Cambridge City, Indiana, October 9, 1849.
He was interred in Cambridge City, Indiana.

Test was the maternal grandfather of author and American Civil War Union Army Major General Lew Wallace, the son of Indiana lawyer and politician David Wallace and Test's daughter Esther. His daughter Mary was the wife of James Rariden, a fellow U.S. Representative from Indiana.

References

1781 births
1849 deaths
19th-century American politicians
Democratic-Republican Party members of the United States House of Representatives
Indiana Democratic-Republicans
Indiana National Republicans
Indiana state court judges
Members of the United States House of Representatives from Indiana
National Republican Party members of the United States House of Representatives
People from Salem, New Jersey
People from Cambridge City, Indiana
Politicians from Philadelphia